Daecheong Island or Daecheongdo is a ,  long and  wide island in Ongjin County, Incheon, South Korea, near the Northern Limit Line. The 1953 Korean Armistice Agreement which ended the Korean War specified that the five islands including Daecheong Island would remain under U.N. and South Korea control. This agreement was signed by both DPRK and United Nations Command. Since then, it serves as a maritime demarcation between North and South Korea in the Yellow Sea (also called West Sea).

History
Daecheongdo Island is thought to be first inhabited during the Neolithic Age (9500–4500 BC), but there are definite signs of culture from the Goryeo Dynasty (918–1392), during which time the island was used as a place of exile for criminals. The Chinese Emperor Toghon Temür (1320–1370) was exiled there by the Mongol Yuan Dynasty for conspiring in a plot arranged by his stepmother. Legend says he arrived at the island with a court and 100 relatives, then built a palace. The island was generally uninhabited until 1793, when King Jeongjo, of the Joseon Dynasty (1392–1897), imported farmers to cultivate the land. During the Japanese occupation of Korea between 1910 and 1945, there were as many as 10,000 people living thanks to its large port. Today, the island only has approximately 1,500 people who sustain a living from tourism and fishing.

Economy
Fishing is popular on the island. Until the late 1980s, skate fishing was a growing industry.

Environment
The island is at the northernmost natural range of the Camellia japonica.

Neighboring islands
Two islands nearby are Baengnyeong Island and the much smaller Socheong Island.

2009 battle

On 10 November 2009, the waters near the island were the scene of a skirmish between the South Korean and North Korean navies. A patrol boat from North Korea was seriously damaged while the navy of South Korea sustained no casualties.

References

External links
Official website
Official website 

Islands of Incheon
Islands of the Yellow Sea
Ongjin County, Incheon